Michael Leron Bumpus (born December 13, 1985) is a former American football wide receiver He was signed by the Seattle Seahawks as an undrafted free agent in 2008. He played college football at Washington State.

Early years
Bumpus attended Culver City Middle School.
Bumpus played high school football at Culver City High School where he graduated in 2004. While playing for Culver City, he was named to the first-team "Best In The West" by the Long Beach Press Telegram

Personal life
Michael is the only child of Renee Bumpus. Raised on the Westside of Los Angeles in a small suburban community of Culver City California, where he excelled in 4 sports.  Ms Bumpus kept her son involved in sports to give him something positive to do after school and to keep him busy while she worked. Michael grew to love sports, especially soccer. As a youngster he excelled in basketball and soccer. Michael traveled to Europe in 2001, where he competed against local soccer teams. Upon his return he joined the Culver City Centaurs football team (Michael was not allowed to play football until high school). In 2004 he became the starting wide receiver for Washington State University in Pullman Washington.  Michael broke several records for most catches, punt return yards and punt return touchdowns. In 2012 Michael and wife Jennifer became the owner operators of Elite Training Academy in Monroe Washington. In February 2015 he was hired as the head football coach at Monroe High School. Starting in 2018, he became a host for the 710 ESPN Seahawks Pre Game show.

College career
Bumpus played his college ball for the Washington State Cougars, where he put up impressive statistics of 195 receptions (a school record), 2,022 yards, and 8 touchdowns. In his freshman year, Bumpus was named to The Sporting News Pac-10 All Freshman Team.

Professional career

Seattle Seahawks
On September 21, 2008 against the St. Louis Rams, Bumpus scored his lone NFL touchdown on a 10-yard pass from Matt Hasselbeck. He was waived by the team on September 1, 2009 during the first round of cuts.

BC Lions
On September 16, 2010, Bumpus was added to the BC Lions roster.

Spokane Shock
Signed on December 10, 2010 to Spokane Shock of the Arena Football League.

References

External links
Seattle Seahawks bio
Washington State Cougars bio
Spokesman-Review Article

1985 births
Living people
Players of American football from Honolulu
Players of Canadian football from Honolulu
American football return specialists
American football wide receivers
American players of Canadian football
Canadian football wide receivers
Washington State Cougars football players
Seattle Seahawks players
BC Lions players
Spokane Shock players